Lyndhurst is a locality in the Shire of Etheridge, Queensland, Australia.

Geography 
The terrain is mostly mountainous and bounded to the east by the Great Dividing Range and to the west by the Gregory Range and Gilbert Range. Significant peaks include Butlers Knob , Mount Lookout , and Teddy Mountain .

The Einasleigh River rises in the south of the locality and flows north. The Copperfield River rises in the west of the locality and flows to the north-west of the locality. The two rivers have their confluence at the town of Einasleigh in the locality to the immediate north of Lyndhurst. The Einasleigh River descends  over its  course.

Blackbraes National Park is in the south of the locality with a small extension into neighbouring Porcupine.

The Kennedy Developmental Road passes through the locality from north to south.

Lyndhurst pastoral station occupies much of the northern part of the locality.

History 
The Lyndhurst pastoral run was established about 1863 by Mr Barnes and John Fulford. The property bred prize-winning Hereford cattle.

Lyndhurst Provisional School opened in 1958 but closed on 5 December 1959. The children were transferred to the Lucky Downs school.

The locality was named and bounded on 23 June 2000. Although the origin of the name of the locality is not recorded, it presumably takes its name from the pastoral station.

References 

Shire of Etheridge
Localities in Queensland